The Sam Muchnick Memorial Tournament was a World Wrestling Federation (WWF) supercard held at the sold-out Kiel Auditorium in St. Louis, Missouri on August 29, 1986, attended by nearly 11,000 fans and making $87,000. The tournament was arranged by Larry Matysik, a protege of Muchnick.

The event was held as a tribute to longtime St. Louis promoter Sam Muchnick and featured a 16-man single-elimination tournament which saw Harley Race defeat Ricky Steamboat in the tournament finals. The semi-main event included a match between Hulk Hogan and Paul Orndorff for the WWF World Heavyweight Championship.

Results
August 29, 1986 in St. Louis, Missouri (Kiel Auditorium)

Tournament bracket
Pin-Pinfall; Sub-Submission; CO-Countout; DCO-Double countout; DQ-Disqualification; Ref-Referee's decision
Hulk Hogan (c) and Paul Orndorff fought to a double-disqualification  the WWF World Heavyweight Championship 16:08

References

WWE shows
1986 in professional wrestling
Professional wrestling memorial shows
WWE tournaments
Events in St. Louis
Professional wrestling in St. Louis
August 1986 events in the United States